The 1907 Saint Louis Blue and White football team was an American football team that represented Saint Louis University as an independent during the 1907 college football season. In its second season under head coach Eddie Cochems, the team compiled a 7–3 record and outscored opponents by a total of 298 to 40.

Schedule

References

Saint Louis
Saint Louis Billikens football seasons
Saint Louis Blue and White football